Harpinder Singh Narula (born December 1953) is a UK-based Indian businessman, the chairman of DS Constructions.

Career
He has been responsible for major construction work in Iran, Libya, and Kuwait.

In 1996, he was the recipient of a National Citizens award from Mother Teresa, for initiatives and innovation in social construction projects.

Personal life

He is married to Surina, a society hostess, and they live in Hertfordshire, England. In 1991, he bought Hyver Hall, a grade II-listed mansion in Arkley, Hertfordshire.

His son Herman Narula is CEO of the London tech company Improbable.

References

1953 births
Indian chief executives
Living people
People from Hertfordshire